Frogfoot may refer to:

 Sukhoi Su-25, NATO reporting name for a family of Russian attack aircraft
 Frog legs, delicacies of French and Cantonese cuisine (food)